The Jan Campert Prize (in Dutch: Jan Campert-prijs) is a Dutch literary prize established in 1948, which is awarded annually for works of poetry by the Jan Campert Foundation. The foundation was created in 1948 to honour Jan Campert, considered by many to be an icon of the Dutch resistance.

Winners

 1948: Jan Elburg, Klein t(er)reurspel
 1949: Michel van der Plas, Going my way
 1950: Hans Lodeizen,  Het innerlijke behang (postuum)
 1951: Bert Voeten, Met het oog op morgen
 1952: Maria Dermoût, Nog pas gisteren
 1953: Albert Besnard, Doem en dorst
 1954: Nes Tergast, Werelden (geweigerd)
 1955: not awarded
 1956: Remco Campert, Met man en muis en Het huis waar ik woonde
 1957: not awarded
 1958: not awarded
 1959: Sybren Polet, Geboorte-stad
 1960: not awarded
 1961: Ellen Warmond, Warmte, een woonplaats
 1962: Gerrit Kouwenaar, De stem op de 3e etage
 1963: Ed. Hoornik, De vis/In den vreemde
 1964: Louis Th. Lehmann, Who's Who in Whatland
 1965: Willem Hussem, Schaduw van de hand
 1966: Hanny Michaelis, Onvoorzien
 1967: Jozef Eykmans, Zonder dansmeester
 1968: Hans Vlek, Een warm hemd voor de winter
 1969: Rutger Kopland, Alles op de fiets
 1970: Hans Andreus, Natuurgedichten en andere
 1971: Paul Snoek, Gedichten
 1972: Albert Bontridder, Zelfverbranding
 1973: Hans van den Waarsenburg, De vergrijzing
 1974: Hugues C. Pernath, Mijn tegenstem
 1975: Eddy van Vliet, Het grote verdriet
 1976: Kees Buddingh', Het houdt op met zachtjes regenen
 1977: Hans Faverey, Chrysanten, roeiers
 1978: Cees Nooteboom, Open als een schelp - dicht als een steen
 1979: Roland Jooris, Gedichten 1958-78
 1980: Ed Leeflang, De hazen en andere gedichten
 1981: Judith Herzberg, Botshol
 1982: Willem van Toorn, Het landleven
 1983: Robert Anker, Van het balkon
 1984: Ad Zuiderent, Natuurlijk evenwicht
 1985: Kees Ouwens, Klem
 1986: Herman de Coninck, De hectaren van het geheugen
 1987: Tom van Deel, Achter de waterval
 1988: H.H. ter Balkt, Aardes deuren
 1989: Miriam van Hee, Winterhard
 1990: Jan Kuijper, Tomben
 1991: Leonard Nolens, Liefdes verklaringen
 1992: Willem Jan Otten, Paviljoenen
 1993: Toon Tellegen, Een dansschool
 1994: Lloyd Haft, Atlantis
 1995: Eva Gerlach, Wat zoekraakt
 1996: Huub Beurskens, Iets zo eenvoudigs
 1997: Elma van Haren, Grondstewardess
 1998: Tonnus Oosterhoff, Robuuste tongwerken, een stralend plenum
 1999: Peter van Lier, Gegroet o...
 2000: K. Michel, Waterstudies
 2001: Arjen Duinker, De geschiedenis van een opsomming
 2002: Menno Wigman, Zwart als kaviaar
 2003: Jan Eijkelboom, Heden voelen mijn voeten zich goed
 2004: Mustafa Stitou, Varkensroze ansichten
 2005: Nachoem Wijnberg, Eerst dit dan dat
 2006: Esther Jansma, Alles is nieuw
 2007: Dirk van Bastelaere, De voorbode van iets groots
 2008: Peter Verhelst, Nieuwe Sterrenbeelden
 2009: Alfred Schaffer, Kooi
 2010: Hélène Gelèns, zet af en zweef
 2011: Erik Spinoy, Dode kamer
 2012 - Wouter Godijn, Hoe H.H. de wereld redde
 2013 - Micha Hamel, Bewegend doel
 2014 - Piet Gerbrandy, Vlinderslag
 2015 - Ilja Leonard Pfeijffer, Idyllen
 2016 - Jan Baeke, Seizoensroddel
 2017 - Marije Langelaar, Vonkt
 2018 - Annemarie Estor, Niemandslandnacht
 2019 - Paul Demets, De Klaverknoop
 2020 - Maud Vanhauwaert, Het stad in mij
 2021 - Mischa Andriessen, Het drogsyndicaat
 2022 - Dominique De Groen, Slangen
Source: Jan Campert Stichting

External links

References

Dutch poetry awards